JBEL may refer to:

 A variation on the name Jabal
 Journal of Business, Entrepreneurship and the Law (JBEL), a publication of Pepperdine University School of Law

See also
 
 Jabal (disambiguation)